Marco Dino Brogi, O.F.M. (12 March 1932 – 29 November 2020) was an Italian prelate of the Catholic Church who worked in the Roman Curia and in diplomatic service of the Holy See.

Biography
Brogi was born in Egypt and was a Latin-rite Catholic. He was ordained a priest on 5 May 1963. 

He was working as undersecretary in the Congregation for the Oriental Churches, when Pope John Paul II named Brogi titular archbishop of Città Ducale, Apostolic Nuncio to Sudan, and Apostolic Delegate to Somalia on 13 December 1997.

John Paul named him Apostolic Nuncio to Egypt and Apostolic Delegate to the Arab League on 5 February 2002. 

Brogi ended his service as Nuncio on 27 January 2006 when he was named a Consultor with the Secretariat of State by Pope Benedict XVI. Benedict named him a Consultor to the Congregation for the Oriental Churches as well on 15 September 2007.

He died from COVID-19 in Florence on 29 November 2020, amid the COVID-19 pandemic in Italy.

Notes

References

External links
 Catholic Hierarchy: Archbishop Marco Dino Brogi, O.F.M. 

1932 births
2020 deaths
Egyptian Roman Catholic priests
Franciscan bishops
20th-century Italian Roman Catholic titular archbishops
Apostolic Nuncios to Egypt
Apostolic Nuncios to the Arab League
Apostolic Nuncios to Sudan
Apostolic Nuncios to Somalia
Deaths from the COVID-19 pandemic in Tuscany